was the third son of Emperor Taishō (Yoshihito) and Empress Teimei (Sadako) and a younger brother of Emperor Shōwa (Hirohito). He became heir to the Takamatsu-no-miya (formerly Arisugawa-no-miya), one of the four shinnōke or branches of the imperial family entitled to inherit the Chrysanthemum throne in default of a direct heir. From the mid-1920s until the end of World War II, Prince Takamatsu pursued a career in the Japanese Imperial Navy, eventually rising to the rank of captain. Following the war, the prince became patron or honorary president of various organizations in the fields of international cultural exchange, the arts, sports, and medicine. He is mainly remembered for his philanthropic activities as a member of the Imperial House of Japan.

Early life 

Nobuhito was born at the Aoyama Palace in Tokyo to then-Crown Prince Yoshihito and Crown Princess Sadako. His childhood appellation was Teru-no-miya (Prince Teru). Like his elder brothers, Prince Hirohito and Prince Yasuhito, he attended the boy's elementary and secondary departments of the Peers' School (Gakushuin). When Prince Arisugawa Takehito (1862–1913), the tenth head of the collateral imperial house of Arisugawa-no-miya, died without a male heir, Emperor Taishō placed Prince Nobuhito in the house. The name of the house reverted to the original Takamatsu-no-miya. The new Prince Takamatsu was a fourth cousin, four times removed of Prince Takehito.

Military service 
Prince Takamatsu attended the Imperial Japanese Naval Academy from 1922 to 1925. He received a commission as an ensign on 1 December 1925 and took up duties aboard the battleship Fusō. He was promoted to sub-lieutenant the following year after completing the course of study at the Torpedo School. The prince studied at the Naval Aviation School at Kasumigaura in 1927 and the Naval Gunnery School at Yokosuka in 1930 - 1931. In 1930, he was promoted to lieutenant and attached to the Imperial Japanese Navy General Staff in Tokyo. He became a squadron commander of cruiser Takao, two years later and subsequently was reassigned to the Fusō. Prince Takamatsu graduated from the Naval Staff College in 1936, after having been promoted to lieutenant commander on 15 November 1935. He was promoted to the rank of commander on 15 November 1940 and finally to captain on 1 November 1942. From 1936 to 1945, he held various staff positions in the Naval General Staff Office in Tokyo.

Marriage 
On 4 February 1930, Prince Takamatsu married Kikuko Tokugawa (26 December 1911 – 18 December 2004), the second daughter of Yoshihisa Tokugawa (peer). The bride was a granddaughter of Yoshinobu Tokugawa, the last Shōgun of the Tokugawa shogunate, and a granddaughter of the late Prince Arisugawa Takehito. Shortly after the wedding, Prince and Princess Takamatsu embarked upon a world tour to Europe and then across the United States so as to strengthen the goodwill and understanding between Japan and those nations. The 1930-1931 photo to the right presents Princess and Prince Takamatsu during their honorary reception given by U.S. President Herbert Hoover who escorted them down Pennsylvania Avenue in Washington, D.C. as thousands of excited spectators looked on.  Prince Tokugawa Iesato (also known as Prince Iyesato Tokugawa) was the uncle of Prince and Princess Takamatsu. Prince Tokugawa allied with Prince and Princess Takamatsu on many international goodwill projects.

Prince and Princess Takamatsu had no children.

Second World War 
From the 1930s, Prince Takamatsu expressed grave reservations regarding Japanese aggression in Manchuria and the decision to wage war on the United States.

After the Battle of Saipan in July 1944, Prince Takamatsu joined his mother Empress Teimei, his uncles Prince Higashikuni, Prince Asaka, former prime minister Konoe Fumimaro, and other aristocrats, in seeking the ouster of the prime minister, Tojo Hideki.

After the surrender 
After the end of WWII, Prince Takamatsu became the honorary president of various charitable, cultural and athletic organizations including the Japan Fine Arts Society, the Denmark-Japan Society, the France-Japan Society, the Tofu Society for the Welfare of Leprosy Patients, the Sericulture Association, the Japan Basketball Association, and the Saise Welfare Society. He also served as a patron of the Japanese Red Cross Society (present day the Honorary President is Empress Michiko) and was a major contributor of the NBTHK (Nihon Bijutsu Token Hozon Kyokai or Society for the Preservation of the Japanese Sword). He also officiated the Honorary President of the Preparatory Committee for founding International Christian University (ICU) located in Mitaka, Tokyo.

In 1975, the Bungei Shunjū literary magazine published a long interview with Takamatsu in which he told of the warning he made to his brother Hirohito on November 30, 1941, the warning he made to him after Midway and that, before the surrender, he and Prince Konoe had considered asking for the emperor's abdication. The interview implied that the emperor had been a firm supporter of the Greater East Asia War (Japanese name of the Pacific War in those days) while the prince was not.

Prince Takamatsu died of lung cancer on February 3, 1987, at the Japanese Red Cross Medical Center (ja, located in Shibuya, Tokyo). His remains were buried at Toshimagaoka Cemetery located in Bunkyō, Tokyo.

Diary

In 1991 the prince's wife Kikuko, Princess Takamatsu and an aide discovered a twenty-volume diary, written in Prince Takamatsu's own hand between 1934 and 1947. Despite opposition from the entrenched bureaucrats of the Imperial Household Agency, she gave the diary to the magazine Chūōkōron, which published excerpts in 1995.

The diary revealed that Prince Takamatsu bitterly opposed the Kwantung Army's incursions in Manchuria in September 1931, the expansion of the July 1937 Marco Polo Bridge Incident into a full-scale war of aggression against China and in November 1941 warned his brother, Hirohito, that the Imperial Japanese Navy could not sustain hostilities for longer than two years against the United States. He urged Emperor Shōwa to seek peace after the Japanese naval defeat at the Battle of Midway in 1942; an intervention which apparently caused a severe rift between the brothers.

Titles, styles and honours 

 3 January 1905 – 5 July 1925: His Imperial Highness Prince Teru
 5 July 1925 – 3 February 1987: His Imperial Highness Prince Takamatsu

National honours 
 Grand Cordon of the Order of the Chrysanthemum (1 February 1925)
 Grand Cordon of the Order of the Rising Sun
 Grand Cordon of the Order of the Sacred Treasure
 Order of the Golden Kite, Fourth Class (29 April 1940)
 China Incident Medal (29 April 1940)

Foreign honours 
 : Grand Cordon Order of Leopold (1930)
 : Knight of the Royal Order of the Seraphim (1930)
 : Knight of the Order of the Most Holy Annunciation
 : Collar of the Order of Charles III (1930)
 : Recipient of the Royal Victorian Chain, conferred in 1930, revoked in 1942.
 : Grand Cross of the Order of the Tower and Sword (1930)
 : Grand Cross of the Order of the White Lion (1931)

Ancestry

Patrilineal descent

Imperial House of Japan

 Descent prior to Keitai is unclear to modern historians, but traditionally traced back patrilineally to Emperor Jimmu
 Emperor Keitai, ca. 450–534
 Emperor Kinmei, 509–571
 Emperor Bidatsu, 538–585
 Prince Oshisaka, ca. 556–???
 Emperor Jomei, 593–641
 Emperor Tenji, 626–671
 Prince Shiki, ???–716
 Emperor Kōnin, 709–786
 Emperor Kanmu, 737–806
 Emperor Saga, 786–842
 Emperor Ninmyō, 810–850
 Emperor Kōkō, 830–867
 Emperor Uda, 867–931
 Emperor Daigo, 885–930
 Emperor Murakami, 926–967
 Emperor En'yū, 959–991
 Emperor Ichijō, 980–1011
 Emperor Go-Suzaku, 1009–1045
 Emperor Go-Sanjō, 1034–1073
 Emperor Shirakawa, 1053–1129
 Emperor Horikawa, 1079–1107
 Emperor Toba, 1103–1156
 Emperor Go-Shirakawa, 1127–1192
 Emperor Takakura, 1161–1181
 Emperor Go-Toba, 1180–1239
 Emperor Tsuchimikado, 1196–1231
 Emperor Go-Saga, 1220–1272
 Emperor Go-Fukakusa, 1243–1304
 Emperor Fushimi, 1265–1317
 Emperor Go-Fushimi, 1288–1336
 Emperor Kōgon, 1313–1364
 Emperor Sukō, 1334–1398
 Prince Yoshihito Fushimi, 1351–1416
 Prince Sadafusa Fushimi, 1372–1456
 Emperor Go-Hanazono, 1419–1471
 Emperor Go-Tsuchimikado, 1442–1500
 Emperor Go-Kashiwabara, 1464–1526
 Emperor Go-Nara, 1495–1557
 Emperor Ōgimachi, 1517–1593
 Prince Masahito, 1552–1586
 Emperor Go-Yōzei, 1572–1617
 Emperor Go-Mizunoo, 1596–1680
 Emperor Reigen, 1654–1732
 Emperor Higashiyama, 1675–1710
 Prince Naohito Kanin, 1704–1753
 Prince Sukehito Kanin, 1733–1794
 Emperor Kōkaku, 1771–1840
 Emperor Ninkō, 1800–1846
 Emperor Kōmei, 1831–1867
 Emperor Meiji, 1852–1912
 Emperor Taishō, 1879–1926
 Nobuhito, Prince Takamatsu

See also
 Praemium Imperiale is an arts prize awarded since 1989 in the memory of Prince Takamatsu

Bibliography 
 Kase Hideaki, Takamatsu no miya kaku katariki, Bungei shunjû, February 1975, pp. 193, 198, 200

References

External links 

Their Imperial Highnesses Prince and Princess Takamatsu at the Imperial Household Agency website

1905 births
1987 deaths
People from Tokyo
Japanese princes
Nobuhito
Imperial Japanese Navy officers
Deaths from lung cancer in Japan
Sons of emperors
Grand Crosses of the Order of the White Lion
Imperial Japanese Navy personnel of World War II